Communauté d'agglomération de l'Ouest Rhodanien is the communauté d'agglomération, an intercommunal structure, centred on the town of Tarare. It is located in the Rhône department, in the Auvergne-Rhône-Alpes region, eastern France. Created in 2014, its seat is in Tarare. Its area is 578.6 km2. Its population was 50,601 in 2019, of which 10,490 in Tarare proper.

Composition
The communauté d'agglomération consists of the following 31 communes:

Affoux
Amplepuis
Ancy
Chambost-Allières
Chénelette
Claveisolles
Cours
Cublize
Dième
Grandris
Joux
Lamure-sur-Azergues
Meaux-la-Montagne
Poule-les-Écharmeaux
Ranchal
Ronno
Saint-Appolinaire
Saint-Bonnet-le-Troncy
Saint-Clément-sur-Valsonne
Saint-Forgeux
Saint-Jean-la-Bussière
Saint-Just-d'Avray
Saint-Marcel-l'Éclairé
Saint-Nizier-d'Azergues
Saint-Romain-de-Popey
Saint-Vincent-de-Reins
Les Sauvages
Tarare
Thizy-les-Bourgs
Valsonne
Vindry-sur-Turdine

References

Ouest Rhodanien
Ouest Rhodanien